Felonious Gru, or Felonius Gru, is a fictional character and the protagonist of the Despicable Me film series. Voiced by American actor Steve Carell, he has appeared in all five films in the series. Gru is a grouchy, quick-witted and extremely cynical former supervillain, who serves as a secret agent in order to fight other supervillains.

Character biography
Gru is the son of Marlena and the Bald Terror, twin brother of Dru, the adoptive father of Margo, Edith, and Agnes, husband of Lucy, and the boss of the Minions. At the beginning of the first film, Gru is an ambitious supervillain who constantly seeks approval from his mother, until the adoption of his daughters convinces him that their happiness is important. In the second film, Gru leaves his villainous past behind to care for his daughters, but then soon joins forces - unwillingly - with secret agent Lucy Wilde, whom he later marries. In the third film, after he and Lucy are fired from their jobs at the Anti-Villain League, Gru learns that he has a twin brother, Dru, because his mother and father took care of each child separately. Along with Lucy and the girls, Gru meets Dru at his mansion in Freedonia, and they form a brotherly relationship over the course of the film. Gru has a complicated relationship with Dru in the beginning, although by the end of the film they have ended up bonding and created a great friendship between them. Gru and Lucy are also later rehired by the Anti-Villain League.

Development
The character that would become Gru was conceived by animator Sergio Pablos, who envisioned him as a Dracula-like character, but the directors of Despicable Me, Chris Renaud and Pierre Coffin, later opted for a more sleek character that would echo "the world of James Bond", with Auric Goldfinger being cited as a particular influence. Gru also bears some design similarities with British comic-book character Grimly Feendish, and with the pre-Crisis version of Lex Luthor.

Gru's distinctive accent, described as "quasi-Russian" by A. O. Scott and "halfway between a Russian mafioso and a crazed Nazi" by Roger Ebert, was largely a product of his voice actor Steve Carell's experimentation. According to Despicable Me producer Chris Meledandri, the voice Carell eventually settled on was conceived as "halfway between Ricardo Montalbán and Bela Lugosi".

Analysis
The use of flashbacks to characterise Gru in Despicable Me was compared by Variety to those used in Pixar's 2007 film Ratatouille to characterise Anton Ego. Gru was cited by Katy Marriner, writing in Screen Education, as one of the premier examples of a protagonist in an animated film who reforms themselves, in contrast to the traditional animated film protagonist who remains heroic throughout. Gru was psychologically analysed by Nofika Dewi of Universitas Pamulang, who found that his rude and ambitious qualities represented his Id; his villainy and tenaciousness represented his Ego, while his competence as a parent and bravery were part of his Super-ego.

Gru has also been interpreted as a Russian stereotype, with a 2017 study stating that elements of his characterisation had been designed to support supposed American political agendas that label Russians as backwards and violent.

References

Further reading

Animated characters introduced in 2010
Animated villains
Despicable Me
Fictional astronauts
Fictional career criminals
Fictional child prodigies
Fictional crime bosses
Fictional gentleman detectives
Fictional gentleman thieves
Fictional hunchbacks
Fictional identical twins
Fictional inventors
Fictional mad scientists
Fictional professional thieves
Fictional scientists in films
Fictional secret agents and spies
Fictional vigilantes
Film characters introduced in 2010
Male characters in animated films
Universal Pictures cartoons and characters
Male film villains